The Ridge School is a private, preparatory school for boys situated in Westcliff, Johannesburg, Gauteng, South Africa.

Situated in Johannesburg and established in 1919, The Ridge is  a South African boys' preparatory school. The school grounds, some 19 acres, are located on Westcliff ridge, with views over Parktown and the surrounding suburbs.

The Ridge School hosts three separate classes per grade level, ranging from Grade 0 through to Grade 7.

External links
The Ridge School official site

 

Boys' schools in South Africa
Schools in Johannesburg
Nondenominational Christian schools in South Africa
Private schools in Gauteng
1919 establishments in South Africa